Scott Douglas Robbe (February 16, 1955 – November 21, 2021) was an American film, television, and theater producer/director, and veteran activist. He was a prominent founding member of both ACT UP and Queer Nation. In 2009 he founded his production company, Feed Your Head Productions.

Career
Robbe's first theatrical production was False Promises by The San Francisco Mime Troupe. He later managed and produced shows On Broadway and Off Broadway in New York, including Harvey Fierstein's play Safe Sex at the Lyceum Theater.

Robbe's first film was In the King of Prussia: he served as associate producer and production manager for director Emile de Antonio. Robbe's television credits include producing credits for Lifetime, Comedy Central, VH1, WonderWorks, Children's Television Workshop, Bravo Channel and American Playhouse. Robbe also served as the executive director and film commissioner for Wisconsin's industry office Film Wisconsin, Inc. bringing Michael Mann's film Public Enemies to film in Wisconsin.

Robbe interviewed playwright Larry Kramer for HBO's program Larry Kramer: In Love with Anger and for his 2012 documentary on Act Up! (with a same title).

Robbe's home renovation series for DIY Network, Vanilla Ice Goes Amish, won RealScreen awards.

In 2019 Scott Robbe gave a speech on MCC Pride: Looking Back Loving Forward.

Filmography
Seven and a Match (2001) – executive producer
Vanilla Ice Goes Amish – (2013) senior producer
Act Up! (2012) director
Queer Eye (2003) – co-supervising producer
Melissa Etheridge: Custom Concert (2001) – line producer
VH1 Presents: Bon Jovi - One Last Wild Night (2001) – line producer
Christmas Dream (2000) – line producer
Diana: Legacy of a Princess (1998) – coordinating producer
Pirate Tales (1997) – drama producer
The Main Ingredient with Bobby Flay (1996) – line producer
Late Date with Sari (1995) – line producer
30 Years of National Geographic Specials (1995) – associate producer
Out There (1993) – line producer
Traitor in My House (1990) – line producer

Stage
Safe Sex – associate producer
San Francisco Mime Troupe – producer

Acting
’’King of Prussia’’ – Officer J. A. Bolling

References

External links 
LinkedIn.com https://www.linkedin.com/pub/scott-robbe/47/923/57a

 Film Reference – http://www.filmreference.com/film/54/Scott-D-Robbe.html
D-Word - https://www.d-word.com/people/ScottyUSA
YouTube video of 2019 Speech on MCC Pride: Looking Back Loving Forward.
YouTube video preview of ACT UP - A documentary in progress (2010)

1955 births
2021 deaths
American theatre managers and producers
American LGBT rights activists
HIV/AIDS activists